Eve's Hangout was a New York City lesbian nightclub established by Polish feminist Eva Kotchever in Greenwich Village, Lower Manhattan, in 1925. The establishment was also known as "Eve Adams' Tearoom", a pun on the names Eve and Adam.

History

After running "The Gray Cottage" with Ruth Norlander in Chicago in 1921–1923 , Kotchever left Norlander and moved to Greenwich Village, which had become an important area for the gay and lesbian community in New York City.

In 1925, Kotchever opened "Eve's Hangout" at 129 MacDougal Street, a mecca for bohemian New Yorkers. The only source that mentions a famous sign on the door that allegedly read "Men are admitted, but not welcome" is a 1926 article in Variety, which accused Adams of being financed by "a ring of rich women cultists" and inviting "mannish" women preying on girls. This led Adams's biographer, Jonathan Ned Katz, to claim that the sign "probably never existed".

The place was a haven for lesbians and migrants, working-class people, and intellectuals. It became a popular club, especially for artists like Berenice Abbott. 
Kotchever organized concerts and readings and meetings where it was acceptable to talk about love between women, political matters, and liberal ideas.
Consequently, Kotchever became a notable figure of "The Village".

Police raid and closure

Bobby Adward, writing for the conservative newspaper the Greenwich Village Quill, described the club as a place "where it is not very healthy for teenagers or comfortable for men." An upstairs neighbor complained to the police. On June 11, 1926, the Vice Squad of NYPD organized a raid on the bar. One of the detectives, the young Margaret Leonard, discovered the book Lesbian Love, that Kotchever wrote under the pseudonym Evelyn Adams. Kotchever was charged with and found guilty of obscenity and disorderly conduct. The bar did not survive the arrest of its owner and soon closed. Kotchever was imprisoned at Jefferson Market before being deported from the United States to Europe, but Greenwich Village did not forget her.

Legacy
Eve's Hangout is notable for LGBT history as well as for New York's Jewish history. It is considered one of the first lesbian bars in the United States and is recognized as part a New York City's heritage,  and is recognized as historic by the National Park Service. It is included on tours for Europeans on official US websites. and has become a must-see.

Playwright Barbara Kahn wrote a play, "The Spring and Fall of Eve Adams," and musical, "Unreachable Eden," about Eve's Hangout.

As of 2020, the building houses an Italian restaurant and jazz club named La Lanterna di Vittorio.

See also
 LGBT culture in New York City
 List of LGBT culture in New York City
 Lesbophobia
 Timeline of LGBT history in New York City
 United States obscenity law

Notes

References

1920s in LGBT history
1925 establishments in New York City
Companies established in 1925
Cultural history of New York City
Defunct LGBT drinking establishments in New York City
Defunct LGBT nightclubs in New York (state)
Drinking establishments in Greenwich Village
Lesbian culture in New York (state)
Lesbian history
New York City Designated Landmarks in Manhattan
Women in New York City